The Old Springdale High School is a historic former school building on Johnson Street in Springdale, Arkansas.  It is a -story red brick Romanesque Revival building, with round-arch windows at the second level and a prominent entry pavilion at the center.  The school was designed by A. O. Clark and completed in 1909.  It is distinguished as a fine example of Clark's early work, and as the city's finest example of Romanesque architecture.

The building was listed on the National Register of Historic Places in 1994. It is currently used as the Springdale Public Schools Administration Building.

See also
National Register of Historic Places listings in Washington County, Arkansas

References

School buildings on the National Register of Historic Places in Arkansas
Romanesque Revival architecture in Arkansas
School buildings completed in 1909
Buildings and structures in Springdale, Arkansas
National Register of Historic Places in Washington County, Arkansas
1909 establishments in Arkansas
Schools in Washington County, Arkansas
Public high schools in Arkansas